City of Commerce Municipal Bus Lines is Commerce, California's transportation service, providing local routes that serve the need of those traveling within the city itself. CMBL complements the Los Angeles County Metropolitan Transportation Authority's routes through the city, which connect this suburb to nearby towns and Downtown Los Angeles. It is only one of few bus lines in the nation that offer completely free bus services.

Routes

References

Public transportation in Los Angeles County, California
Bus transportation in California